William McKennie (1868–1902) was a Scottish footballer who played in the Football League for Darwen and Preston North End.

References

1868 births
1902 deaths
Scottish footballers
English Football League players
Preston North End F.C. players
Darwen F.C. players
Association football wingers